The beetle family Phengodidae is known also as glowworm beetles, whose larvae are known as glowworms.  The females and larvae have bioluminescent organs. They occur throughout the New World from extreme southern Canada to Chile. The recently recognized members of the Phengodidae, the Cydistinae, are found in Western Asia. The family Rhagophthalmidae, an Old World group, used to be included in the Phengodidae.

Larval and larviform female glowworms are predators, feeding on millipedes and other arthropods occurring in soil and litter. The winged males, which are often attracted to lights at night, are short-lived and probably do not feed. Females are much larger than the males and are completely larviform. Males may be luminescent, but females and larvae have a series of luminescent organs on trunk segments which emit yellow or green light, and sometimes an additional head organ which emits red light, as in railroad worms.

This family is distinct from the fireflies (family Lampyridae), which may also be called "glow-worms" in its larval stage. According to a few recent studies, Phengodidae might possibly include (or be sister taxon to) the long-lipped beetles, which are primarily differentiated from phengodids by the unusual modifications of their mouthparts; long-lipped beetles were treated as a family Telegeusidae but are most recently treated as a subfamily within the family Omethidae.

Genera 

 Acladocera
 Adendrocera
 Brasilocerus
 Cenophengus
 Cephalophrixothorax
 Cydistus
 Decamastinocerus
 Distremocephalus
 Eurymastinocerus
 Euryognathus
 Euryopa
 Howdenia
 Mastinocerus
 Mastinomorphus
 Mastinowittmerus
 Microcydistus
 Microphengodes
 Neophengus
 Nephromma
 Oxymastinocerus
 Paramastinocerus
 Paraptorthodius
 Penicillophorus
 Phengodes
 Phrixothrix
 Pseudomastinocerus
 Pseudophengodes
 Ptorthodiellus
 Ptorthodius
 Spangleriella
 Steneuryopa
 Stenocladius
 Stenophrixothrix
 Taximastinocerus
 Zarhipis

References 

 Sean T. O'Keefe, "Phengodidae", in Ross H. Arnett, Jr. and Michael C. Thomas, American Beetles (CRC Press, 2002), vol. 2

External links 

 Phengodidae in J. F. Lawrence, A. M. Hastings, M. J. Dallwitz, T. A. Paine and E. J. Zurcher (2000 onwards). Elateriformia (Coleoptera): descriptions, illustrations, identification, and information retrieval for families and sub-families.
 glow-worms on the UF / IFAS Featured Creatures Web site

 
Bioluminescent insects
Beetle families
Beetles of North America
Beetles of South America
Insects of Central America